The Incredible World of James Bond was a 1965 television special produced by David L. Wolper for United Artists Television to showcase the James Bond film series and promote the upcoming December 1965 release of the film Thunderball.

In the United States, the show replaced The Man From U.N.C.L.E. on NBC on Friday, 26 November 1965; the day after American Thanksgiving that unofficially begins the shopping frenzy for Christmas. It was the highest rated American television show for the week.

Plot and production
The show featured film scenes of the worldwide popularity of James Bond novels, films, and tie-in merchandise, black and white scenes of Ian Fleming at his home Goldeneye in Jamaica giving comments on his writing, a biography of James Bond with footage of Glencoe, Eton, Fettes College, and Royal Marine Commandos on exercise, home movie footage shot by production designer Ken Adam in the Bahamas during the production of Thunderball, and scenes from four Bond films.

Behind the scenes footage from the making of Thunderball included scenes of the preparation and filming of a scene of a rocket firing motorcycle destroying Count Lippe's car, a choreographed fist fight in a studio mock up of the cabin of the Disco Volante, a photo shoot of the Bond girls on a beach in the Bahamas, and a scene of the Aston Martin DB5 driving away from the Château d'Anet that was not seen in the finished film.

Director Terence Young, producers Albert R. Broccoli, Harry Saltzman, Kevin McClory, editor Peter R. Hunt and action director and stuntman Bob Simmons are shown during sequences. The "James Bond Theme" and other music from the Bond film soundtracks are heard with the gun barrel titles and 007 logo from the Goldfinger film trailer appearing in the opening titles.

The narration was to have been originally given by Sean Connery. However, when Connery read the script and found out they were referring to James Bond as an actual person he refused to do the show. Telephone calls from Joan Crawford who was a major shareholder in Pepsi Cola, the sponsor of the show, failed to sway Connery and his narrating chores were taken by Alexander Scourby.

Pepsi Cola used the special to unveil commercials for its latest products.

The special is available as a featurette on the "James Bond Ultimate Edition" DVD of Thunderball.

Record album

Pepsi Cola and Frito Lay also sold promotional James Bond tie-in toys and a record album titled The Incredible World of James Bond. The album featured the original soundtrack music and cover versions of four of the themes from the first three Bond films played by United Artists Records house band The Leroy Holmes Orchestra. The back of the album cover was full of photographic stills from the Bond films. The record was later reissued with an attractive Frank Gauna designed album cover on Unart Records in 1967 with two music tracks deleted to fit on the budget album.

See also
Outline of James Bond

References

External links
 
 documentary credits http://www.davidlwolper.com/shows/details.cfm?showID=196
 Record album http://www.317x.com/albums/v/various/card.html

1965 television specials
1965 documentary films
1960s American television specials
American documentary television films
Thunderball (film)
NBC television specials
James Bond
Television shows directed by Jack Haley Jr.
1965 films
1960s American films
1960s British films